"Dancin' Away with My Heart" is a song recorded by American country music trio Lady Antebellum.  It was released in December 2011 as the third single from their album Own the Night.  The song was written by Hillary Scott, Charles Kelley, Dave Haywood and Josh Kear.  It became a top 5 hit, and it features lead vocals from both Scott and Kelley.

Critical reception
Billy Dukes of Taste of Country gave the song three and a half stars out of five, saying that it "aims right down the country-pop middle but leaves one wanting for a little more depth." Kevin John Coyne of Country Universe gave the song a D, writing that "it isn't bad enough to be offensive" and "it doesn't exist enough to be bad."

Music video
The music video was directed by Adam Boatman and premiered in February 2012.
This was the back up video after the high-budget original video was shot in December, which was never released.

Chart performance
"Dancin' Away with My Heart" debuted at number 57 on the U.S. Billboard Hot Country Songs chart for the week of December 24, 2011. It soon peaked at number 2, behind "Drink on It" by Blake Shelton and "Banjo" by Rascal Flatts.

Year-end charts

Certifications

References

2011 singles
2011 songs
Lady A songs
Black-and-white music videos
Songs written by Hillary Scott
Songs written by Charles Kelley
Songs written by Dave Haywood
Songs written by Josh Kear
Song recordings produced by Paul Worley
Capitol Records Nashville singles
Country ballads